Fort Tompkins (1812–1815) was a redoubt at Sackets Harbor, New York. A minor redoubt in a fortified line of four such "forts" (Kentucky, Virginia, Chauncey, Stark) anchored at Fort Pike (later Madison Barracks) on the bay, protecting the land side of Sackets Harbor.

Sources
 New York State Division of Military and Naval Affairs: Military History

Buildings and structures in Jefferson County, New York
Tompkins (Sackets)
Tompkins (Sackets)